The District 7 School is a historic school building at 366 Chicopee Row in Groton, Massachusetts.  The one-room single story brick building was built c. 1833, and is one of four surviving district schools (of which it is the best-preserved) in the town.  The building has only very limited vernacular Federal styling, but has retained interior finish work from both the early and late 19th century.  The property includes a 19th-century outhouse.  The building served as a school until 1916, after which time it was taken over by a community non-profit for use as a community center.

The schoolhouse was listed on the National Register of Historic Places in 2008.

See also
National Register of Historic Places listings in Middlesex County, Massachusetts

References

Schools in Middlesex County, Massachusetts
School buildings on the National Register of Historic Places in Massachusetts
Education in Groton, Massachusetts
National Register of Historic Places in Middlesex County, Massachusetts
Buildings and structures in Groton, Massachusetts